Silco is an unincorporated community in Camden County, in the U.S. state of Georgia.

History
A post office called Silco was established in 1894, and remained in operation until 1911. Either the name is invented, or it is derived from the Creek language.

References

Unincorporated communities in Georgia (U.S. state)
Unincorporated communities in Camden County, Georgia